Susanville (formerly known as Rooptown) is a town in and the county seat of Lassen County, California, United States. Its population is 16,728 as of the 2020 census, down from 17,947 from the 2010 census.

Susanville, a former logging and mining town, is the site of two state prisons: the California Correctional Center, a minimum-medium security facility, which opened in 1963; and the High Desert State Prison, California (not to be confused with High Desert State Prison, Nevada), which opened in 1995. The Federal Correctional Institution, Herlong is nearby, having opened in 2001.

The prisons and their effects on the community, including the addition of local jobs, were explored in the documentary Prison Town, USA (2007), aired on PBS. Nearly half the adult population of Susanville works at the three prisons in the area, where 6,000 people are incarcerated.

Etymology
It was originally known as Rooptown, named for Isaac Roop, a pioneer of the Honey Lake District.  Roop later renamed the town Susanville in honor of his daughter in 1857.

History
The Susanville US post office was established in 1860. Susanville was incorporated in 1900.

Formerly the center of farming, mining and the lumber industry, Susanville suffered from the loss of jobs as these industries changed or declined in the 20th century. Since the late 20th century, the only area of growth in the economy has been associated with the construction and operation of two state prisons in the city and one federal prison in the area. In 2007, half of the adult population of Susanville worked in the prisons: the California Correctional Center, a minimum-medium security facility, which opened in 1963; the High Desert State Prison, California (not to be confused with High Desert State Prison, Nevada), which opened in 1995; and the Federal Correctional Institution, Herlong, which opened in 2007.

Geography
It is considered a gateway city to Reno on U.S. Route 395.

According to the United States Census Bureau, the city has a total area of 8.03 square miles (20.8 km), of which 7.95 square miles (20.58 km) or 98.93% is land and 0.09 square miles (0.22 km) or 1.07% is water.

Geology
Susanville is underlain by igneous rock, which provides the parent material for its well-drained brown stony to gravelly sandy loams or loams. On the western outskirts under forest cover, the soils are often reddish brown. The most common soil series in Susanville's urban area is Springmeyer gravelly fine sandy loam.

Climate
Susanville has an alpine climate (Köppen Dsb) with cool winters and hot, mostly dry summers, except for occasional afternoon thunderstorms. Records have been kept at several stations since 1893, including Susanville Airport and Susanville 2 SW, southwest of the town center, along with two other stations with shorter records.

Annual precipitation averaged  from 1971 to 2000, with an average of 66 days with measurable precipitation. Susanville Airport has averaged a somewhat higher  between 1893 and 2012.

Demographics

2010
At the 2010 census Susanville had a population of 17,947. The racial makeup of Susanville was 11,269 (62.8%) White, 2,249 (12.5%) African American, 212 (1.2%) Native American, 198 (1.1%) Asian, 111 (0.6%) Pacific Islander, 2,928 (16.3%) from other races, and 580 (3.2%) from two or more races. There were   4,259 people (23.7%) of Hispanic or Latino ancestry.

The census reported that 9,439 people (52.6% of the population) lived in households, 108 (0.6%) lived in non-institutionalized group quarters, and 8,400 (46.8%) were institutionalized.

There were 3,833 households, 1,357 (35.4%) had children under the age of 18 living in them, 1,645 (42.9%) were opposite-sex married couples living together, 499 (13.0%) had a female householder with no husband present, 233 (6.1%) had a male householder with no wife present.  There were 327 (8.5%) unmarried opposite-sex partnerships, and 16 (0.4%) same-sex married couples or partnerships. 1,161 households (30.3%) were one person and 405 (10.6%) had someone living alone who was 65 or older. The average household size was 2.46.  There were 2,377 families (62.0% of households); the average family size was 3.05.

The age distribution was 2,559 people (14.3%) under the age of 18, 2,547 people (14.2%) aged 18 to 24, 7,633 people (42.5%) aged 25 to 44, 4,024 people (22.4%) aged 45 to 64, and 1,184 people (6.6%) who were 65 or older.  The median age was 33.6 years. For every 100 females, there were 273.7 males.  For every 100 females age 18 and over, there were 327.3 males.

2000
As of the census of 2000, there were 13,541 people in 3,516 households, including 2,250 families, in the city. The racial makeup of the city was 76.0% White, 12.5% African American, 3.2% Native American, 1.1% Asian, 0.9% Pacific Islander, 3.5% from other races, and 2.8% from two or more races. Hispanic or Latino of any race were 15.6% of the population.

Of the 3,516 households 37.4% had children under the age of 18 living with them, 46.4% were married couples living together, 13.2% had a female householder with no husband present, and 36.0% were non-families. 29.9% of households were one person and 10.7% were one person aged 65 or older. The average household size was 2.49 and the average family size was 3.10.

The age distribution was 20.0% under the age of 18, 13.6% from 18 to 24, 41.5% from 25 to 44, 17.1% from 45 to 64, and 7.7% 65 or older. The median age was 32 years. For every 100 females, there were 198.3 males. For every 100 females age 18 and over, there were 231.6 males.

The median income for a household in the city was $35,675, and the median family income was $45,216. Males had a median income of $29,973 versus $27,044 for females. The per capita income for the city was $13,238. About 11.0% of families and 14.3% of the population were below the poverty line, including 14.5% of those under age 18 and 9.1% of those age 65 or over.

Government

Local government 
The current city council members are:

List of mayors 
This is a list of Susanville mayors by year.
 1975 Jim Chapman
 2016 Kathie Garnier
 2018 Kevin Stafford 
 2020 Mendy Schuster

State and federal representation

Transportation

Susanville lies at the junction of California State Routes 36 and 139. Highway 139 heads north to the Oregon border as a direct route to Klamath Falls. Highway 36 runs west to Red Bluff, then east to where it terminates with U.S. Route 395 just outside Susanville's city limits. U.S. 395 connects Alturas to the north and Reno to the south.

Lassen Rural Bus, operated by the Lassen County Transportation Commission, provided bus service within the city. Sage Stage, operated by Modoc County,  connects Alturas, Susanville, and Reno, Nevada, with connections to Redding, California and Klamath Falls, Oregon.

The Quincy Railroad no longer serves Susanville on the former Southern Pacific Railroad line since 2004. A Union Pacific Railroad caboose has been placed on an intact section of track next to the rail depot.

Economy

Two California Department of Corrections and Rehabilitation facilities, High Desert State Prison and California Correctional Center, are in Susanville.

Top employers
According to Susanville's 2014 Comprehensive Annual Financial Report, the top employers in the city are:

Notable people
 Dugan Aguilar (1947–2018), Maidu/Achomawi/Northern Paiute photographer
Hardin Barry, baseball player and lawyer, returned to practice law after a one-season career in professional baseball
Frank Cady, actor (Petticoat Junction, Green Acres, and The Beverly Hillbillies).
Aaron Duran, writer, media producer grew up in Susanville.
Jack Ellena, former Los Angeles Rams player, born and raised in Susanville and ran a summer camp near town
Mike Leach, former Mississippi State head football coach was born in Susanville.
Mitch Lively, former player for the San Francisco Giants, was born in Susanville
Kevin Mangold, professional jockey, stunt double, actor, author
Freddy Nagel, bandleader
Ryan O'Callaghan, NFL player (Kansas City Chiefs, New England Patriots).
Frank Shamrock, mixed martial artist
Ken Shamrock, mixed martial artist and professional wrestler
Mike Skinner, NASCAR driver
Benjamin "Coach" Wade, reality television contestant

References

External links

SusanvilleStuff.com
Lassen County Chamber of Commerce
Images of Susanville from the Eastman's Originals Collection,  Special Collections Dept., University of California, Davis.

1900 establishments in California
Cities in Lassen County, California
County seats in California
Incorporated cities and towns in California
Populated places established in 1900